The neural basis of prey detection, recognition, and orientation was studied in depth by Jörg-Peter Ewert in a series of experiments that made the toad visual system a model system in neuroethology (neural basis of natural behavior). He began by observing the natural prey catching behavior of the common European toad (Bufo bufo).

Ewert's work with toads yielded several important discoveries (Ewert 1974, 2004). In general, his research revealed the specific neural circuits for recognition of complex visual stimuli. Specifically, he identified two main regions of the brain, the tectum and the thalamic-pretectal region, that were responsible for discriminating prey from non-prey and revealed the neural pathways that connected them. Furthermore, he found that the neural mechanisms are plastic and adaptable to varying environments and conditions (Carew 2000; Zupanc 2004).

Natural toad behavior

The common toad responds to a moving insect or worm with a series of prey-catching reactions: (1) orienting towards prey, (2) stalking up to prey, (3) binocular fixation, (4) snapping, (5) swallowing and (6) mouth-wiping with forelimb (Ewert 1974). This series of movement constitutes a stimulus-response chain, where each reaction of the toad provides the stimulus constellation for the next response. First, if an object is recognized as prey and thus catches the toad's attention, the toad will orient towards the stimulus by turning its body to face it. Then it approaches the prey, binocularly focusing intently on it. During the attack, it snaps at the object with its tongue or jaws and swallows it, using the ability to perceive depth, stereopsis, to aid in the feat. Finally, it wipes its mouth with a forelimb. These actions constitute a series of well-defined behavioral patterns.

One reason for this type of stimulus-response chain is that, unlike humans, toads do not have involuntary saccadic eye movements and they also cannot perform "tracking eye movements" (Ewert 1980). They must, therefore, depend on recognizing the stimulus before they respond. As a result, they have developed a specific detection system that, for example, allows them to discriminate between edible prey and dangerous predators.

The lack of saccadic eye movements forces the toad to hold its eyes in rigid positions. Therefore, it must decide whether the object is "prey" or "non-prey" before moving itself. If it orients towards an object, it must already have decided "prey" and then commits itself to snapping by reducing the thresholds for subsequent prey-catching responses. Even when the prey stimulus quickly disappeared after orienting, the aroused toad may sometimes complete the subsequent responses.

Prey vs. predator response

When a toad is presented with a moving stimulus, it generally may react with one of two responses. Depending on the size and the configuration of the stimulus, it will either engage in orienting (prey-catching) behavior or avoidance (escape) behavior, which consists of "planting-down" defensive postures or a crouching avoidance response.

In determining the size of a stimulus, a toad will consider both the angular size, which is measured in degrees of visual angle, and the absolute size, which takes into consideration the distance between the toad and the object. This second ability, to judge absolute size by estimating distance, is known as size constancy.

To study behavioral responses of toads to varying types of stimuli, Ewert conducted experiments by placing the toad in the center of a small cylindrical glass vessel. He then rotated a small stripe (bar) of contrasting cardboard (acting as a visual 'dummy') around the vessel to mimic either prey-like or threat-like stimuli; see Video. The rate of turning was recorded as a measure of orienting behavior (prey-catching activity). By changing characteristics of the visual stimulus in a methodical manner, Ewert was able to comprehensively study the key features that determine behavior.

Up to a certain size, squares rotated around the toad successfully elicited prey-catching responses. Toads avoided large squares. Vertical bars nearly never elicited prey-catching behavior and they were increasingly ineffective with increasing height. Horizontal bars, in contrast, were very successful at eliciting prey-catching behavior and their effectiveness increased with increasing length, to a certain degree. Additional vertical segments on top of horizontal bars significantly decreased prey-catching responses. In general, movement of a rectangle in the direction of its long axis is perceived by the toad to be wormlike, whereas movement along the short axis is interpreted as anti-wormlike. By means of a different experimental setup it was shown that the worm vs. anti-worm discrimination is independent (invariant) of the direction the object moves in the toad's visual field.

It is important to note that stationary objects usually elicit no prey-catching or avoidance responses. However, toads in an untextured surrounding cannot distinguish between the retinal image of a small moving object and the retinal image of a small stationary object induced by the toad's own motion. Both images elicit prey-capture. In a textured surrounding, however, the induced moving retinal image is ignored. 

In addition, the contrast between stimuli and background can significantly affect the type of behavior. In response to a wormlike stripe, common toads orient and snap towards the edge leading in the direction of motion, given that the stripe is black and the background white. If the stimulus/background contrast is reversed, the toad prefers the trailing edge of the white stripe and often snaps behind it. Obviously, "off"-effects (rapid change in luminance from bright to dark) by the moving contrast borders play a guiding role. Generally, white square objects moving against a black background are more attractive as prey than black objects on white. However, this tendency is plastic and reverses seasonally, where black objects against a white background are much more effective at eliciting prey-catching behavior in the fall and winter (Ewert 1980).

Feature detectors and the visual system

To understand the neural mechanisms underlying the toad's behavioral responses, Ewert performed a series of recording and stimulation experiments. First and foremost, the results allowed him to understand the way the visual system is constructed and connected to the central nervous system. Secondly, he discovered areas of the brain that were responsible for differential analysis of stimuli.

First, the retina is connected to the optic tectum by at least three types of ganglion cells, each with an excitatory receptive field and a surrounding inhibitory receptive field, but they differ in the diameter of their central excitatory receptive fields. Diameters in Class II (R2) ganglion cells are approximately four degrees visual angle. Those in Class III (R3) cells are about eight degrees and Class IV (R4) ganglion cells range from twelve to fifteen degrees. As stimuli move across the toad's visual field, information is sent to the optic tectum in the toad's midbrain. The optic tectum exists as an ordered localization system, in the form of a topographical map. Each point on the map corresponds to a particular region of the toad's retina and thus its entire visual field. Likewise, when a spot on the tectum was electrically stimulated, the toad would turn toward a corresponding part of its visual field, providing further evidence of the direct spatial connections.

Among Ewert's many experimental goals was the identification of feature detectors, neurons that respond selectively to specific features of a sensory stimulus. Results showed that there were no "worm-detectors" or "enemy-detectors" at the level of the retina. Instead, he found that the optic tectum and the thalamic-pretectal region (in the diencephalon) play significant roles in the analysis and interpretation of visual stimuli (summarized in Ewert 1974, 2004; Ewert and Schwippert 2006).

Electrical stimulation experiments demonstrated that the tectum initiates orienting and snapping behaviors. It contains many different visually sensitive neurons, among these Type I and Type II neurons (later named T5.1 and T5.2, respectively). Type I neurons are activated when an object traversing the toad's visual field is extended in the direction of movement; Type II neurons, too, but they will fire less when the object is extended in a direction that is perpendicular to the direction of movement. Those T5.2 neurons display prey-selective properties; see prey feature detectors. The discharge patterns of these neurons – recorded in freely moving toads – "predict" prey-catching reactions, e.g. the tongue flip of snapping. Their axons project down to the bulbar/spinal motor systems, such as the hypoglossal nucleus which harbors the motor neurons of the tongue muscles. In combination with additional projection neurons, prey-selective cells contribute to the ability of the tectum to initiate orienting behavior and snapping, respectively.

The thalamic-pretectal region initiates avoidance behavior in the toad. More specifically, electrical triggering the thalamic-pretectal region initiates a variety of protective movements such as eyelid closing, ducking and turning away (Ewert 1974, 2004). Various types of neurons in this region are responsible for the avoidance behaviors and they are all sensitive to different types of stimuli. One type of neurons (TH3) is activated by large threatening objects, especially those ones that are extended perpendicularly to the direction of motion. Another type (TH6) is activated by a looming object moving toward the toad. Still other types (TH10) respond to large stationary obstacles, and there are also neurons responding to stimulation of the balance sensors in the toad's ear. Stimulation of (a combination of) such types of neurons would cause the toad to display different kinds of protective behaviors.

Lesioning experiments led to the discovery of pathways extending between the tectum and the thalamic-pretectal region. When the tectum was removed, orienting behavior disappeared. When the thalamic-pretectal region was removed, avoidance behavior was entirely absent while orienting behavior was enhanced even to predator stimuli. Furthermore, prey-selective properties were impaired both in prey-selective neurons and in prey-catching behavior (Zupanc 2004). Finally, when one half of the thalamic-pretectal region was removed, the disinhibition applied to the entire visual field of the opposite eye. These and other experiments suggest that pathways, involving axons of type TH3 cells, extend from the pretectal thalamus to the tectum, suitable to modulate tectal responses to visual stimuli and to determine prey-selective properties due to inhibitory influences.

Modulatory loops and evolutionary perspectives
Having analyzed neuronal processing streams in brain structures (pretectal, tectal, medullary) that mediate between visual stimuli and adequate behavioral responses in toads, Ewert and coworkers examined various neural loops that — in connection with certain forebrain structures (striatal, pallial, thalamic)—can initiate, modulate or modify stimulus-response mediation (Ewert and Schwippert 2006). For example, in the course of associative learning the toad's visual prey schema can be modified to include non-prey objects. After lesions to a telencephalic structure involved in learning—the posterior ventromedial pallium—this learning effect fails and prey recognition shows again its species-specific selectivity. The posterior part of the ventromedial pallium is homologous to the hippocampus of mammals which is also involved in learning processes. Both in anuran amphibians and mammals striatal efferents are, for example, involved in directed attention, i.e. gating an orienting response towards a sensory stimulus. The anuran striatum is homologous to a portion of the amniote basal ganglia.

From an evolutionary point of view it is important to note that the tetrapod vertebrates share a common pattern of homologous brainstem and forebrain structures (e.g., see Reiner et al. 1998; González et al. 1999; Kenigfest et al. 2002). Neuroethological, neuroanatomical, and neurochemical investigations suggest that the neural networks underlying essential functions—such as attention, orienting, approaching, avoidance, associative or non-associative learning, and basic motor skills—have, so to speak, a phylogenetic origin in homologous structures of the amphibian brain.

From a neural network approach, it is reasonable to ask whether the toad's ability to classify moving objects by special configuration cues—object's dimension parallel vs. perpendicular to the direction of motion—is unique in the animal kingdom. Developmental studies suggest that this detection principle is an adaptation in terrestrial amphibians to their biotope and thus addressed to objects that are moving on land. Actually, it was found that this specific detection ability fails to occur in aquatic frogs (Rana esculenta). In common toads (Bufo bufo) it was shown that this detection property matures during the metamorphosis of the aquatic tadpoles in the course of their transition to terrestrial life (independent of food experience). Comparable detection principles are discovered in amphibious fish (Periophthalmus koelreuteri) and in insects (Sphodromantis lineola). In mammals, erect body postures, for example, may address a threat signal to a rival. This suggests that the configuration-algorithm responsible for the distinction between profitable (e.g., prey-like) vs. dangerous (e.g., threat-like) may be implemented by quite different neural networks. Studies in artificial neuronal nets support this presumption (for an example see Ewert 2004).

Stereopsis in Toads 
Previously thought to be characteristic of solely primates and mammals with front-facing eyes, the ability to process depth information from multiple visual points in space has been determined to be possessed by most amphibians, namely, frogs and toads (Nityananda and Read 2017). From an evolutionary point of view, there has been substantial support for the idea that stereo vision has evolved as a natural progression for animals with binocular vision, meaning, a substantial distance between the two eyes (Nityananda and Read 2017). This theory would mean that stereopsis has evolved independently at least four times to account for stereo vision being present in mammals, birds, amphibians, and some invertebrates.

For toads in particular, stereopsis would prove massively advantageous, as depth perception would be particularly useful in aiding in catching prey and calculating distance.

See also
 Feature detection (nervous system)
 Jörg-Peter Ewert
 Neuroethology

References
 Carew, T.J (2000). Feature analysis in Toads. In Behavioral Neurobiology, Sunderland, MA: Sinauer, 95-119.
 Ewert, J.-P. (1974). The neural basis of visually guided behavior. Scientific American, 230(3), 34-42.
 Ewert, J.-P. (1980). Neuroethology: an introduction to the neurophysiological fundamentals of behavior. Springer-Verlag, Berlin/Heidelberg/New York.
 Ewert J.-P. (2004) Motion perception shapes the visual world of amphibians. In: Prete F.R. (Ed.) Complex Worlds from Simpler Nervous Systems. Cambridge, MA, MIT Press, pp. 117–160
 Ewert J.-P., Schwippert W.W. (2006) Modulation of visual perception and action by forebrain structures and their interactions in amphibians. In: Levin E.D. (ed.) Neurotransmitter Interactions and Cognitive Function. Birkhäuser, Basel, pp. 99–136
 González A., Smeets W.J., Marín O. (1999). Evidences for shared features in the organization of the basal ganglia in tetrapods: studies in amphibians. Eur.  J. Morphol., 37(2-3), 151-154.
 Kenigfest N.B., Belekhova M.G., Karamyan O.A., Minakova M.N., Rio J.-P., Reperant J. (2002). Neurochemical organization of the turtle protectum: an immunohistochemical study. Comparative analysis. J. Evol. Biochem. Physiol., 38(6), 673-688.
 Nityananda, V., and J. C. A. Read. 2017. Stereopsis in animals: evolution, function and mechanisms. Journal of Experimental Biology 220:2502–2512.
 Reiner A., Medina L., Veenman C.L. (1998). Structural and functional evolution of the basal ganglia in vertebrates. Brain. Res. Rev., 28, 235-285.
 Zupanc, G. (2004) Behavioral Neurobiology: An Integrative Approach. Oxford University Press. 121-132.

External links 
 Details and references on toad vision—see also: .
 Feature detection by artificial neuronal net

Toads
toads